Eupithecia gratiosata is a moth in the  family Geometridae. It is found in France, the Iberian Peninsula, Italy, the Balkan Peninsula, Ukraine, Poland, Russia, Turkmenistan, Kazakhstan, the Near East and Iran.

The wingspan is 21–25 mm.

The larvae feed on various Apiaceae species.

References

Moths described in 1861
gratiosata
Moths of Europe
Moths of Asia
Taxa named by Gottlieb August Wilhelm Herrich-Schäffer